Therea olegrandjeani sometimes known as the question-mark cockroach for their conspicuous markings is a species of cockroach found in India. The species was described based on a specimen collected from Gooty and the species is known from the Telangana and Andhra Pradesh regions. It is also popular among pet insect keepers around the world.

References

External links
 Cockroach Species File

Insects of India
Cockroaches
Insects described in 2008